Joe Enook (1957 – March 29, 2019) was a Canadian politician who was elected to represent the district of Tununiq in the Legislative Assembly of Nunavut in a by-election on September 12, 2011. He was re-elected in 2013 and 2017. In 2017, he was acclaimed as Speaker of the Legislative Assembly of Nunavut, the office he held until his death in March 2019. During his tenure as a Member of the Legislative Assembly and as its Speaker, he rarely addressed the legislature in English, as he preferred to promote the use of Inuktitut.

Enook was born in 1957 near Pond Inlet. He died in office in 2019 after a short illness at the age of 61.

References

External links
. Biography at the Legislative Assembly of Nunavut

Members of the Legislative Assembly of Nunavut
Inuit from Nunavut
Inuit politicians
People from Pond Inlet
21st-century Canadian politicians
Speakers of the Legislative Assembly of Nunavut
1957 births
2019 deaths